Richmond Ekow Barnes, affectionately known as Ekow Barnes, is a Ghanaian fashion writer, who specializes in producing content in Africa.

Early life and education
Ekow Barnes was born in the Western Region of Ghana and attended the Ghana Secondary Technical School, before proceeding to Bluecrest College, where he obtained a Bachelor of Arts degree in Public Relations and Image Management.

Career
Barnes started his career at Strategic Communications Africa (Stratcomm Africa) as a PR intern, a role he held for four years and six months. He later became a fashion consultant at Will & Barnes in Accra for two years. He has also worked as a model for some fashion brands.

Barnes has more than 20 publications from different magazines and editorials across continents. He has worked on numerous projects involving brands including Facebook, Burberry, Emirates Airlines, Mercedes Benz, Essence, Glamour Magazine, Uber, Chiip 0 Neal, and many others.

He recently spearheaded New Balance football boots campaign for Senegalese player Sadio Mane at the 2022 AFCON tournament in Cameroon.

References

Ghanaian writers
Living people
Year of birth missing (living people)